Joseph Nally (born 13 July 1999) is a British road and track cyclist from Scotland, who currently rides for UCI Continental team .

Nally became a British champion after winning the British National Points Championships at the 2017 British National Track Championships.

Major results
2017
 1st  Points race, National Track Championships
 Junior Tour of Wales
1st Stages 3 & 4
 2nd  Team pursuit, UEC European Junior Track Championships

References

External links

1999 births
Living people
British male cyclists
British track cyclists
Scottish track cyclists